Summerlin South, also seen on maps as South Summerlin, is a census-designated place (CDP) in Clark County, Nevada, United States, on the western edge of the Las Vegas Valley and adjacent to the Red Rock Canyon National Conservation Area. It is so named because it is a southward extension of the master-planned community of Summerlin. Nearly all of Summerlin South is in ZIP code 89135. The population was 24,085 at the 2010 Census.

The Summerlin South Community Association is the main governmental entity of the area – it is a homeowners association for the entire community.

Summerlin South is considered to be one of the most prestigious neighborhoods in the Las Vegas Valley. The area includes The Ridges, a guard-gated community consisting of custom and semi-custom homes in southwest Summerlin. In The Ridges, the average home price is over $2,000,000.

Geography
It is bounded on the north by Charleston Boulevard, Hualapai Way to the east and Red Rock Canyon National Conservation Area to the west. Current development expands just below Russell Rd on the south but future developments will expand to Maule Ave.

According to the United States Census Bureau, the CDP has a total area of 9.64 square miles (24.97 km2).

Demographics

As of the census of 2010, there were 24,085 people and 10,173 households residing in the CDP. The racial makeup of the CDP was 76.2% White, 4.4% African American, 0.4% Native American, 12.8% Asian, 0.4% Pacific Islander, 1.8% from other races, and 3.9% from two or more races. Hispanic or Latino of any race were 8.6% of the population.

There were 10,173 households, out of which 27.7% had children under the age of 18 living with them. 54.6% were married couples living together, and 33.3% were non-families. 25.7% of all households were made up of individuals, and 2.9% had someone living alone who was 65 years of age or older. The average household size was 2.37 and the average family size was 2.86.

In the CDP, the age distribution was 21.3% under the age of 18 and 78.7% over the age of 18. Age 65 and over made up 18% of the population.  The median age was 42.9 years.

Between 2011–2013, median household income was $91,535 and mean household income was $139,061, almost double the US mean household income.

See also

 List of census-designated places in Nevada

References

 South
Census-designated places in Clark County, Nevada
Las Vegas Valley